Bharatasimha Reddy is a 2002 Indian Telugu-language drama film directed by Surya Prakash. The film stars Rajasekhar, Meena, Gajala and Ravali in lead roles, with Annapoorna, Gundu Hanumantha Rao, Narra Venkateswara Rao, Raghu Babu  and Giri Babu playing supporting roles. The film, produced by Teja, had musical score by S. A. Rajkumar and was released on 2002.

Plot 
Bharata Simha Reddy is story of father and son in which, Raja (Rajasekhar) is a wayward youth who hates his look-alike father Devudayya (Rajasekhar).

Raja lives away from his father and tells everybody that his father killed his mother and that he is now living with his stepmother. But Devudayya is very fond of his son and he provides food, shelter and other amenities to his son through another channel. Raja fell love with Gajala. Raja knows the truth about his father and he realizes and he unites his mother and father together.

Cast 

 Rajasekhar as Devudayya/Raja
 Meena as Devudayya's Wife
 Gajala as Shanti
 Ravali as Kalyani
 Anandaraj 
 Narra Venkateswara Rao as Raja's step father
 Annapoorna as Raja's Step mother
 Raghu Babu
 Giri Babu
 Brahmanandam as Jandakapi Raju
 Rallapalli 
 Bandla Ganesh
 Ramaraju
 Chitti Babu
 Sarika Ramachandra Rao
 Sharma KK
 Junior Relangi
 Anita Choudary as Devudayya Sister
 Tanish

Soundtrack 
The film score and the soundtrack were composed by S. A. Rajkumar. The soundtrack, released in 2002, features 6 tracks with lyrics written by Murthy ES, Sai Harsha, Suddala Ashok Teja and Chandrabose .

References

External links 
 

Indian drama films